Zindaggi Rocks (translates as Life Rocks) is a 2006 Bollywood film, directed by Tanuja Chandra and produced by Anurradha Prasad. It is about the love story between a famous singer, Kriya, played by Sushmita Sen and a doctor, played by Shiney Ahuja.

Plot
Dr. Suraj Rihan  meets Kriya, a popular singer, in his hospital. While he is a quiet, responsible man, she is loud, kiddish and a little crazy. Kriya invites Suraj to meet her family, which includes her mother, who is very strict and her mother's twin sister, who is fun and giggly. Kriya has an adopted son, who is very mature for his age.

Kriya and Suraj fall in love and their new feelings are tested by a crisis. Kriya's son is in a critical state as he has a hole in his heart and they are unable to find a donor till the date of the operation. This makes Kriya commit a homicide.

Cast
 Sushmita Sen as Kriya Sengupta 
 Julian Burkhardt as Dhruv
 Shiney Ahuja as Dr. Suraj Rihan
 Moushumi Chatterjee as Indrani Sengupta, Kriya's mother / Mausi (Double role)
 Kim Sharma as Joy (voice dubbed by Urvi Ashar)
 Ravi Gossain as Sam
 Seema Biswas as DCP Gazala Qadri
 Olivier Lafont as Lester

Soundtrack

The album features six original and four remixed songs. All tracks were composed by Anu Malik and the lyrics penned by Sayeed Quadri and Mudassar Aziz.

Track lists

Critical reception
Taran Adarsh of IndiaFM gave the film 1.5 stars out of 5, writing ″Sush tries hard to infuse life in her character. She is effective at places, but tends to get theatrical at times. Shiney does a decent job, although the screenplay gives him little scope to go beyond a set of expressions. Moushumi Chatterjee is okay as the mother, but hams as the twin-sister. The get-up also doesn't suit her age. Kim Sharma is wasted. The child artist, Julian, is wonderful. Seema Biswas, as the cop, is alright. Ravi Gosain gets no scope. On the whole, ZINDAGGI ROCKS just doesn't rock. At the box-office, it's bound to go unnoticed. Gullu Singh of Rediff.com gave the film 1 star, writing ″Sushmita Sen and Shiney Ahuja do their best to save the film but the script and dialogues are so shoddy that it is impossible for them to do so.″

References

External links
 Official site
 

2006 films
2000s Hindi-language films
Films scored by Anu Malik
Films directed by Tanuja Chandra